Krishna Murari Moghe (born 2 December 1947) is an Indian politician. He was elected as 14th Mayor of Indore from December 2009 until his resignation in February 2015, he is currently serving as the housing board minister of Madhya Pradesh. He served as State Secretary of BJP. He served as Member of Parliament from Khargone from 2004 to 2007. He is chairman of the All India Council of Mayors.

References

External links
 https://web.archive.org/web/20110721170412/http://indore.nic.in/statistics.htm

Living people
1947 births
Bharatiya Janata Party politicians from Madhya Pradesh
People from Khargone
Politicians from Indore
Marathi people
Mayors of places in Madhya Pradesh
Lok Sabha members from Madhya Pradesh
India MPs 2004–2009